Voacangine (12-methoxyibogamine-18-carboxylic acid methyl ester) is an alkaloid found predominantly in the root bark of the Voacanga africana tree, as well as in other plants such as Tabernanthe iboga, Tabernaemontana africana, Trachelospermum jasminoides, Tabernaemontana divaricata and Ervatamia yunnanensis. It is an iboga alkaloid which commonly serves as a precursor for the semi-synthesis of ibogaine. It has been demonstrated in animals to have similar anti-addictive properties to ibogaine itself. It also potentiates the effects of barbiturates. Under UV-A and UV-B light its crystals fluoresce blue-green, and it is soluble in ethanol.

Pharmacology

Pharmacodynamics
Voacangine exhibits AChE inhibitory activity. Docking simulation reveals that it has inhibitory effect on VEGF2 kinase and reduces angiogenesis. Like ibogaine, its a potent HERG blocker in vitro. It also acts as antagonist to TRPM8 and TRPV1 receptor but agonist of TRPA1.

Pharmacokinetics
The absolute bioavailability of voacangine is around 11-13%.

Side effects
High doses of voacangine produce convulsions and asphyxia.

See also 
 18-Methoxycoronaridine
 Coronaridine
 Ibogaine
 Noribogaine

References 

Indole alkaloids
Alkaloids found in Iboga
HERG blocker
Drug rehabilitation
Methyl esters
Phenol ethers
Carboxylate esters